Heaven Is Never a Great Distance (Persian title: Behesht door nist- )  is a 1969 Iranian Persian-genre dance Romantic film directed by Esmaeil Riahi and starring Mohammad Ali Fardin, Asadolah Yekta, Forouzan and Taghi Zohouri .

Cast

References

1969 films
1960s romantic musical films
Iranian musical films
1960s dance films
1969 romantic drama films
1960s Persian-language films
Iranian romantic drama films